Organic brain syndrome, also known as organic brain disease, organic brain disorder, organic mental syndrome, or organic mental disorder, refers to any syndrome or disorder of mental function whose cause is alleged to be known as organic (physiologic) rather than purely of the mind. These names are older and nearly obsolete general terms from psychiatry, referring to many physical disorders that cause impaired mental function. They are meant to exclude psychiatric disorders (mental disorders). Originally, the term was created to distinguish physical (termed "organic") causes of mental impairment from psychiatric (termed "functional") disorders, but during the era when this distinction was drawn, not enough was known about brain science (including neuroscience, cognitive science, neuropsychology, and mind-brain correlation) for this cause-based classification to be more than educated guesswork labeled with misplaced certainty, which is why it has been deemphasized in current medicine. While mental or behavioural abnormalities related to the dysfunction can be permanent, treating the disease early may prevent permanent damage in addition to fully restoring mental functions. An organic cause to brain dysfunction is suspected when there is no indication of a clearly defined psychiatric or "inorganic" cause, such as a mood disorder.

Types 
Organic brain syndrome can be divided into 2 major subgroups: acute (delirium or acute confusional state) and chronic (dementia). A third entity, encephalopathy (amnestic), denotes a gray zone between delirium and dementia. The Diagnostic and Statistical Manual of Mental Disorders has broken up the diagnoses that once fell under the diagnostic category organic mental disorder into three categories: delirium, dementia, and amnestic.

Delirium 

Delirium or Acute organic brain syndrome is a recently appearing state of mental impairment, as a result of intoxication, drug overdose, infection, pain, and many other physical problems affecting mental status. In medical contexts, "acute" means "of recent onset". As is the case with most acute disease problems, acute organic brain syndrome is often temporary, although this does not guarantee that it will not recur or progress to become chronic, that is, long-term. A more specific medical term for the acute subset of organic brain syndromes is delirium. Thinking, remembering, sleeping, and paying attention can become difficult during alcohol withdrawal, after surgery, or with dementia.

Dementia 

Dementia or chronic organic brain syndrome is long-term. For example, some forms of chronic drug or alcohol dependence can cause organic brain syndrome due to their long-lasting or permanent toxic effects on brain function. Other common causes of chronic organic brain syndrome sometimes listed are the various types of dementia, which result from permanent brain damage due to strokes, Alzheimer's disease, or other damaging causes which are irreversible. Amnestic pertains to amnesia and is the impairment in ability to learn or recall new information, or recall previously learned information. Although similar, it is not coupled with dementia or delirium.

Amnestic 

Amnestic conditions denotes a gray zone between delirium and dementia; its early course may fluctuate, but it is often persistent and progressive. Damage to brain functioning could be due not only to organic (physical) injury (a severe blow to the head, stroke, chemical and toxic exposures, organic brain disease, substance use, etc.) and also to non-organic means such as severe deprivation, abuse, neglect, and severe psychological trauma.

Symptoms
Many of the symptoms of Organic Mental Disorder depend on the cause of the disorder, but are similar and include physical or behavioral elements. Dementia and delirium are the cause of the confusion, orientation, cognition or alertness impairment. Therefore, these symptoms require more attention because hallucinations, delusions, amnesia, and personality changes are the result. These effects of the dementia and delirium are not joined with the changes of sensory or perception abilities. Memory impairment, judgment, logical function and agitation are also some extremely common symptoms. The more common symptoms of OBS are confusion; impairment of memory, judgment, and intellectual function;  and agitation. Often these symptoms are attributed to psychiatric illness, which causes a difficulty in diagnosis.

Associated conditions
Disorders that are related to injury or damage to the brain and contribute to OBS include, but are not limited to:
 Alcoholism
 Alzheimer's disease
 Attention deficit/hyperactivity disorder
 Autism
 Concussion
 Encephalitis
 Epilepsy
 Fetal alcohol syndrome
 Hypoxia
 Parkinson's disease
 Intoxication/overdose caused by substance use disorders including alcohol use disorder
 Non-medical use of sedative hypnotics
 Intracranial hemorrhage/trauma
 Korsakoff syndrome
 Mastocytosis
 Meningitis
 Psychoorganic syndrome
 Stroke/transient ischemic attack (TIA)
 Withdrawal from drugs, especially sedative hypnotics, e.g. alcohol or benzodiazepines

Other conditions that may be related to organic brain syndrome include: clinical depression, neuroses, and psychoses, which may occur simultaneously with the OBS.

Treatment
While the treatment depends on which particular disorder is involved in Organic Mental Disorder, a few that are possible. Treatments can include, but are not limited to, rehabilitation therapy such as physical or occupational, pharmacological modification of the neurotransmitter function, or medication. The affected parts of the brain can recover some function with the help of different types of therapy. Online therapy can be just as intense and helpful as rehabilitation therapy, in person, and can help those affected regain function in daily life.

Prognosis 
Some disorders are short-term and treatable, and their prognosis is not as lengthy. Rest and medication are the most common courses of action for these treatable cases to help the patient return to proper health. Many of the cases are long-term, and there is not as much of a set and defined prognosis. The course of action can include extensive counseling and therapy. There are many reasons that the long-term cases are harder to treat and these include these cases normally get worse over time, and medication or therapy could not work. In this case, many of the prognosis tracks are to help the patient and their family become more comfortable and understand what will happen.

Associated conditions
 Brain injury caused by trauma
 Bleeding into the brain (intracerebral hemorrhage)
 Bleeding into the space around the brain (subarachnoid hemorrhage)
 Blood clot inside the skull causing pressure on brain (subdural hematoma)
 Concussion
 Breathing conditions
 Low oxygen in the body (hypoxia)
 High carbon dioxide levels in the body (hypercapnia)
 Cardiovascular disorders
 Abnormal heart rhythm (arrhythmias)
 Brain injury due to high blood pressure (hypertensive brain injury)
 Dementia due to many strokes (multi-infarct dementia)
 Heart infections (endocarditis, myocarditis)
 Stroke
 Transient ischemic attack (TIA)
 Degenerative disorders
 Alzheimer's disease (also called senile dementia, Alzheimer's type)
 Creutzfeldt–Jakob disease
 Diffuse Lewy Body disease
 Huntington's disease
 Multiple sclerosis
 Normal pressure hydrocephalus
 Parkinson's disease
 Pick's disease
 Dementia due to metabolic causes
 Drug and alcohol-related conditions
 Alcohol withdrawal state
 Intoxication from drug or alcohol use
 Wernicke–Korsakoff syndrome (a long-term effect of excessive alcohol consumption or malnutrition)
 Withdrawal from drugs (especially sedative-hypnotics and corticosteroids)
 Infections
 Any sudden onset (acute) or long-term (chronic) infection
 Blood poisoning (sepsis)
 Brain infection (encephalitis)
 Meningitis (infection of the lining of the brain and spinal cord)
 Prion infections such as mad cow disease
 Late-stage syphilis (general paresis)
 Other medical disorders
 Cancer
 Kidney disease
 Liver disease
 Thyroid disease (high or low)
 Vitamin deficiency (B1, B12, or folate)
 Lithium toxicity can cause permanent organic brain damage
 Accumulation of metals in the brains
 Aluminum
 Mercury poisoning

References

External links 
 AllRefer Health.com. 13 December 2006.

Mental disorders due to brain damage
Syndromes